Warta Polpharma is a maxi-catamaran, that participated in many major offshore races.

Its different names were :
 Jet Service V, skippered by Serge Madec
 Commodore Explorer, skippered by Bruno Peyron
 Explorer, skippered by Bruno Peyron
 Warta Polpharma, skippered by Roman Paszke for The Race.

Records 
 Under the name Jet Service V: Transatlantic sailing record for 11 years, between 1988 and 2001.
 Under the name Commodore Explorer : Winner of the Jules Verne Trophy (fastest round the world) in 1993 in 79 days 6 hours 15 minutes and 56 seconds, with skipper Bruno Peyron and router Pierre Lasnier, with an average speed of 11.35 knots.
 Under the name Warta Polpharma : Finished 4th of The Race in 2000, with skipper Roman Paszke and crew: Robert Janecki, Mariusz Pirjanowicz, Wojciech Dlugozima, Ryszard Block, Dariusz Drapella, Zbigniew Gutkowski, Jaroslaw Kaczorowski, Piotr Cichocki.

References 

Individual catamarans
Individual sailing vessels
1980s sailing yachts
Sailing yachts designed by Gilles Ollier
Sailing yachts built in France
The Race yachts